Bellavitis is a surname. Notable people with the surname include:

Giusto Bellavitis (1803–1880), Italian mathematician
Arturo Dell'Acqua Bellavitis (born 1947), Italian art curator